Boudh is a Vidhan Sabha constituency of Boudh district, Odisha.

Area of this constituency includes Boudh, 11 GPs (Telibandha, Khuntabandha, Mursundhi, Badhigam, Mundapada, Baghiapada, Brahmanipali, Ambajhari, Tikarapada, Padmanapur and Laxmiprasad) of Boudh block and Harbhanga block.

Elected Members

Fourteen elections held during 1951 to 2014. Elected members from the Boudh constituency are:

2019: (86): Pradip Kumar Amat (BJD)
2014: (86): Pradip Kumar Amat (BJD)
2009: (86): Pradip Kumar Amat (BJD)
2004: (105): Pradip Kumar Amat (BJD)
2000: (105): Pradip Kumar Amat (Independent)
1995: (105): Satchida Nanda Dalal (Janata Dal)
1990: (105): Satchida Nanda Dalal (Janata Dal)
1985: (105): Sujit Kumar Padhi (Congress)
1980: (105): Himanshu Sekhar Padhi (Congress-I)
1977: (105): Natabar Pradhan (Janata Party)
1974: (105): Natabar Pradhan (Swatantra)
1971: (105: Natabar Pradhan (Swatantra)
1967: (105):Himansu Sekhar Padhi(Orissa Jana Congress)
1961: (32): Anirudha Dipa (Ganatantra Parishad)
1951: (32): Himansu Sekhar Padhy (Independent)

2019 Election Result

2014 Election Result
In 2014 election, Biju Janata Dal candidate Pradip Kumar Amat defeated Indian National Congress candidate Susanta Kumar Pradhan by a margin of 11,148 votes.

2009 Election Results
In 2009 election, Biju Janata Dal candidate Pradip Kumar Amat defeated Independent candidate Susanta Kumar Pradhan by a margin of 28,207 votes.

Notes

References

Assembly constituencies of Odisha
Boudh district